MLB on FS1 is the de facto name for the presentation of Major League Baseball (MLB) games produced by Fox Sports for Fox Sports 1 (FS1). FS1 airs 40 regular season MLB games (mostly on Saturdays), along with post-season games from the Division Series and League Championship Series).

Business history

On September 19, 2012, Sports Business Daily reported that Major League Baseball would agree to separate eight-year television deals with Fox Sports and Turner Sports through the 2021 season. Fox would reportedly pay around $4 billion over eight years (close to $500 million per year), while Turner would pay around $2.8 billion over eight years (more than $300 million per year). Under the new deals, Fox and TBS' coverage would essentially be the same as in the 2007–2013 contract with the exception of Fox and TBS splitting coverage of the Division Series, which TBS has broadcast exclusively dating back to 2007. More importantly, Fox would carry some of the games (such as the Saturday afternoon Game of the Week) on its new general sports channel, Fox Sports 1, which launched on August 17, 2013. Sources also said it was possible that Fox would sell some League Division Series games to MLB Network.

On October 2, 2012, the new deal between Major League Baseball and Fox was officially confirmed; it included the television rights to 12 Saturday afternoon games on Fox (reduced from 26), 40 games on Fox Sports 1, rights to the All-Star Game, two League Division Series (two games were sold to MLB Network, the rest would air on Fox Sports 1), one League Championship Series (in which Fox Sports and Turner Sports would each respectively alternate coverage of American League and National League postseason games each year on an odd-even basis, with Games 1 and, if necessary, 6 in 2014 airing on Fox), and the World Series (which would remain on Fox). In addition, all Fox Saturday Baseball games would be made available on MLB Extra Innings and MLB.TV (subject to local blackout restrictions), Fox Sports was awarded TV Everywhere rights for streaming of game telecasts on computers, mobile and tablet devices, rights to a nightly baseball highlights show, Spanish language rights to all games carried on Fox and Fox Cable (Fox Deportes) and rights to a weekly show produced by MLB Productions.

On November 15, 2018, Fox renewed its rights through 2028, maintaining its existing structure but with expanded digital rights, and a promise to begin airing more games on the Fox broadcast network (beginning with at least two of the first four League Championship Series games and all seventh games from 2020 to 2028, with additional games in 2022). It had been criticized for airing only Game 1 of the 2019 American League Championship Series, while placing the rest on Fox Sports 1.

Scheduling history
Beginning with the 2014 television contract, FS1's regular-season telecasts are not exclusive, with the teams' local broadcasters also showing the games and FS1 broadcasts of those games blacked-out in the teams' local markets.

As of 2022, most FS1 games air Saturday afternoons, with additional, irregularly scheduled weeknight games. Weeknight games that have aired on FS1 include:

Monday nights

Tuesday nights

Wednesday nights

Thursday nights

Saturday afternoons
As of the 2022 season, FS1 carries a Saturday afternoon game most weeks. These games, like the weeknight games, are non-exclusive. FS1's coverage begins with the pregame show a half-hour before the game, which usually starts at 1 or 4 p.m. Eastern Time. If there is a second game on FS1, which occurs in the early season before the Fox broadcast network's exclusive Saturday evening coverage begins, a studio show is aired in between.

Postseason coverage

With FS1 taking over most MLB coverage in 2014, postseason coverage on Fox Sports' end of the package began to be split between the Fox broadcast network and FS1. The deal, which brought back Division Series baseball to Fox for the first time since 2006, put Fox's Division Series games exclusively on FS1. As part of their contract renewal before the 2019 season, Fox has agreed to air any League Championship Series Game 7 that Fox Sports has rights to (not including the game 7 on TBS) on the broadcast network. Fox airs the World Series in its entirety, as has been the case every year since 2000.

For the 2020 NLCS however, while Fox aired Games 1, 4 and 7, FS1 aired every game except Game 1 as it simulcast Games 4 and 7. (Game 4 was scheduled to air only on FS1 but the postponement of a previously scheduled Thursday Night Football game that was supposed to air on Fox allowed both Fox and FS1 to air the game.)

For the 2021 ALCS, Fox aired Games 1 and 2 while FS1 aired Games 2–6 (Game 2 was simulcast on both channels), Game 7 would have aired on both networks had the series gone its distance. From 2022 on, Fox will air more postseason games as part of the renewal made in 2018.

Digital on-screen graphics

In 2020, Fox unveiled a new graphics package for its NFL and college football coverage starting with Super Bowl LIV. Baseball broadcasts continued using this package through the end of the 2021 regular season, as the new on-screen look is for football only. Beginning with the 2021 season, Fox and FS1 started using stylized cartoon illustrations on players rather than traditional photos, similar to those used on the network's NFL coverage since the previous year's Super Bowl.

Theme music

NJJ Music composed the original MLB on Fox theme music in 1996. This theme music was used exclusively from June 1996 until early May 2007. In mid-May 2007, an updated version was unveiled, featuring a more jazzy feel and implementing a full orchestra instead of the synth elements used by the 1996 theme.

Beginning with the 2010 postseason, both the 2007 theme and the Flach theme were replaced by the longtime NFL on Fox theme music, which began to be used for all Fox sporting events.

In 2014, the 2007–2010 jazz theme was brought back for regular season games on MLB on FS1. The NFL theme was retained for MLB on Fox, including Fox Saturday Baseball, Baseball Night in America, the All-Star Game and all coverage of the postseason. However, occasionally one of the two themes was heard on telecasts that were designated for the other, implying that the designations are slightly fluid.

In 2020, MLB on Fox reintroduced the original 1996–2007 theme; Fox Sports regional affiliates continued to use the 2007–2010 theme until the network was rebranded to Bally Sports in 2021. As of the 2021 season, the original theme is now used for coverage of all games across both Fox and FS1.

Ratings

Postseason
 2014 National League Championship Series
 Game 2: 4.4 million viewers
 Game 4: 5.1 million viewers
 Game 5: 4.9 million viewers
 2015 American League Championship Series
 Game 1: 5.9 million viewers
 Game 6: 5.6 million viewers
 2016 National League Championship Series
 Game 2: 7.3 million viewers
 Game 6: 9.7 million viewers
 2017 American League Championship Series
 Game 1: 6.2 million viewers
 Game 3: 3.1 (5.1 million viewers)
 Game 4: 4.7 million viewers
 Game 5: 3.3 (5.3 million viewers)
 Game 6: 8.2 million viewers
 Game 7: 9.9 million viewers
 2018 National League Division Series
 Milwaukee Brewers vs. Colorado Rockies
 Game 1: 2.46 million viewers
 Game 2: 1.77 million viewers
 Los Angeles Dodgers vs. Atlanta Braves
 Game 2: 2.03 million viewers
 Game 3: 3.02 million viewers
 Game 4: 2.17 million viewers
 2018 National League Championship Series
 Game 1: 4.64 million viewers
 Game 3: 4.21 million viewers
 Game 4: 4.21 million viewers
 2019 American League Division Series
 New York Yankees vs Minnesota Twins
 Game 2: 2.32 million viewers
 Game 3: 2.66 million viewers
 Houston Astros vs Tampa Bay Rays
 Game 1: 2.53 million viewers
 Game 2: 1.39 million viewers
 Game 4: 3.70 million viewers
 Game 5: 3.67 million viewers
 2019 American League Championship Series
 Houston Astros vs New York Yankees
 Game 2: 5.59 million viewers
 Game 3: 3.84 million viewers
 Game 4: 5.86 million viewers
 Game 5: 5.63 million viewers
 Game 6: 7.47 million viewers
 2020 National League Division Series
 Los Angeles Dodgers vs San Diego Padres
 Game 1: 1.49 million viewers
 Game 2: 1.64 million viewers
 Atlanta Braves vs Miami Marlins
 Game 1: 1.30 million viewers
 Game 3: 1.01 million viewers
 2020 National League Championship Series
 Los Angeles Dodgers vs Atlanta Braves
 Game 2: 2.46 million viewers
 Game 3: 2.09 million viewers
 Game 4: 5.04 million viewers (also aired on Fox)
 Game 5: 3.61 million viewers
 Game 6: 4.28 million viewers
 Game 7: 9.67 million viewers (also aired on Fox)
 2021 American League Division Series
 Tampa Bay Rays vs Boston Red Sox
 Game 1: 2.70 million viewers
 Game 2: 2.70 million viewers
 Game 4: 3.47 million viewers
 Houston Astros vs Chicago White Sox
 Game 1: 2.06 million viewers
 Game 4: 1.70 million viewers
 2021 American League Championship Series
 Houston Astros vs Boston Red Sox
 Game 2: 5.7 million viewers (also aired on Fox)
 Game 3: 4.1 million viewers

Saturday afternoons

Commentators and studio personalities

Game 1 of the 2014 National League Championship Series was simulcast on Fox Sports 1 and hosted by Kevin Burkhardt, Gabe Kapler and C. J. Nitkowski, who offered sabermetric analysis of the game.

Joe Davis called play-by-play for Game 4 of the 2019 American League Championship Series due to Joe Buck calling Thursday Night Football for Fox.

Other MLB related programming
As part of Fox Sports' new Major League Baseball broadcast deal, in April 2014, Fox Sports 1 premiered MLB Whiparound, an hour-long nightly baseball highlight program (similar in vein to ESPN's Baseball Tonight and MLB Network's MLB Tonight) featuring quick-turnaround highlights, and news and analysis from around the league (live look-ins of games being played in progress generally can not be shown on Whiparound, as MLB Tonight is reserved that right exclusively). It is hosted by Chris Myers, who is joined by one or two analysts rotating between Frank Thomas, Eric Karros, Dontrelle Willis and C. J. Nitkowski. Although Whiparound airs most weeknights at 10 p.m., the Wednesday editions are usually delayed to 12 a.m. Eastern Time on weeks when Fox Sports 1 airs a sporting event in prime time during the MLB season (on weeks without predetermined programming conflicts, the program airs in its regular 10 p.m. slot).

Also in 2014, Fox Sports 1 began airing MLB 162 (the title being a reference to the total number of games each team plays during the Major League Baseball season), which was hosted by Julie Alexandria. In 2015, Fox Sports 1 began airing MLB's Best, a half-hour weekly show completely containing highlights of the best plays of the previous week in a countdown format, with no host or interviews.

See also
Fox Sports 1#Programming
List of programs broadcast by Fox Sports 1

References

External links
 
 Searchable Network TV Broadcasts

Fox Sports 1 original programming
2014 American television series debuts
2010s American television series
2020s American television series
Sports telecast series
FS1
American sports television series